Seleuciana was an ancient city and bishopric in Algeria. It was a Catholic titular see.

History 
Seleuciana was a city in the Roman province of Numidia. It was important enough to become a bishopric.

Titular see 
In 1964, the diocese was nominally restored as titular see of the lowest (episcopal) rank.

It has had the following (non-consecutive) incumbents:
 Giovanni Bianchi (1964.06.22 – 1977.06.27)
 Gonzalo López Marañón, Discalced Carmelites (O.C.D.), Apostolic Vicar emeritus of San Miguel de Sucumbíos (Ecuador)
 Marek Forgáč, Auxiliary bishop of Košice (Slovakia)

See also  
 Seleucia (disambiguation)

References

External links 
 GigaCatholic, with titular incumbent biographical links

Catholic titular sees in Africa